Smithers Secondary or SSS is a public high school in Smithers, British Columbia, part of School District 54 Bulkley Valley.

History  
The first high school students in Smithers attended classes in the Old Scott Hall.  The first one room high school was located where Muheim Memorial Elementary school now stands.  Then, in 1927, a two-room school house was built which accommodated approximately 60 students.  As the population of Smithers steadily grew, so did the number of students. Starting in 1963, students in the junior grades were gradually moved from Smithers Secondary to Chandler Park Junior Secondary School.  In 1978 Smithers Senior Secondary School was built at 4408 3rd Ave.  It enrolled 400 students in Grades 10-12 and was staffed by 23 full-time and 4 part-time teachers.  In 1981, the Grade Nine students were once again moved from Chandler Park to SSS.  There was an expansive addition which also included a theatre in 2000.  In 2004 "Chandler Park Middle School" closed down and Smithers Senior Secondary School became Smithers Secondary School accommodating Grades 8–12.  Increasing enrolment since that time has required the School District to put up 8 portables.

Current 
In the 2020–21 school year, SSS has approximately 600 students, 60 teaching staff and 30 support staff. It has traditionally done well in several areas such as track & field, music, and wrestling, often producing provincial and national champions.  The girls' wrestling team placed first at provincials in 2011.

Theatre 
The "Della Herman Theatre" is housed inside Smithers Secondary School and hosts theatrical, musical and dance events throughout the year. It is also the classroom for the Theatre Department in SSS so the students have hands on experience with the stage and sets.

Athletics 
The Smithers Secondary School athletic teams go by the name "SSS Gryphons" and have been very successful for a small town since opening.

References

"Smithers Secondary - Home." Smithers Secondary. n.d. Web. Accessed 10 Sep. 2020 from: http://sssweb.sd54.bc.ca/

"Student Headcount by Grade."  Education Analytics, Government of BC.  n.d.  Web.  Accessed 5 Apr. 2021 from: https://catalogue.data.gov.bc.ca/dataset/bc-schools-student-headcount-by-grade/resource/c1a55945-8554-4058-9019-514b16178f89 (Line 81752)

External links
School District 54
SSSWeb

High schools in British Columbia
Smithers, British Columbia
Educational institutions in Canada with year of establishment missing